Hokksund is a town in the municipality of Øvre Eiker in the county of Viken, Norway.

History
Hokksund is the administrative centre, and largest town in Øvre Eiker, with a population of around 8,000. Hokksund is located 18 km west of Drammen. The river Drammenselva flows through the town, 500m from the centre. Hokksund has developed on both sides of the river. Hokksund is located in a rich agricultural district. Forestry has traditionally been the principal industry, but engineering, especially electrical as well as the cement industry, have become important within the past century.  There are three hotels in Hokksund and a campsite there, which holds up to 240 caravans.

Transportation
Hokksund Station (Hokksund stasjon) is on the Sørlandet Line. The station is served by local trains (R12) between Kongsberg via Oslo to Eidsvoll operated by Vy. The railway line is part of the Oslo - Bergen, and the Oslo - Kristiansand - Stavanger route. The two nearest international airports are Oslo Airport, Gardermoen and Sandefjord Airport, Torp, but there is a Hokksund Airport, with the ICAO airport code of ENHS. Hokksund is approximately 17 km to the west of Drammen.

Local attractions
Haug Church (Haug kirke), originally built in 1152, is a Medieval stone church consisted of the west tower, nave and chancel. The church was extensively repaired and redecorated from 1961 to 1962. The organ was built by the German organ builder Jürgen Ahrend in 2004.

Nøstetangen Museum at the old county farm (Sorenskrivergården), shows how glass was made according to ancient tradition. Nøstetangen glassworks operated here from 1741 to 1777.  It produced table-glass and chandeliers in the German and English style. Adjacent to the museum's garden is the Skriverparken, a beautiful park area extending down to river.

Notable residents

Broiler (DJs), (formed 2011) Norwegian DJ
Johan Buttedahl, (born 1935) a dentist and politician 
Kate Gulbrandsen, (born 1965) a Norwegian singer at the Eurovision Song Contest 1987
Stian Hole, (born 1969) graphic designer, illustrator and writer of children's books
Jonas Lie (1833-1908), novelist, poet, and playwright.

Sport 
Ole Bremseth, (born 1961) a former ski jumper.
Geir Holte, (born 1959) a cross-country skier. 
Tor Håkon Holte, (born 1958) a cross-country skier
Sverre Isachsen, (born 1970) a rallycross driver
Svend Karlsen, (born 1967) a former strongman

References

External links
Pictures of Hokksund (1903-1927)

Cities and towns in Norway
Populated places in Buskerud
Øvre Eiker